William F. Riley (March 20, 1884 – December 29, 1956) was a United States district judge of the United States District Court for the Southern District of Iowa.

Education and career

Born in Ainsworth, Iowa, Riley earned an Artium Baccalaureus degree from  the State University of Iowa (now the University of Iowa) in 1907, and an unspecified law degree from University of Iowa College of Law in 1909. He was in private practice in Des Moines, Iowa from 1909 to 1942, except for his service during World War I as a lieutenant in the United States Army's legal department. After serving from 1942 to 1945 as a Special Assistant United States Attorney General and hearing officer for the Selective Service Bureau, Riley returned to his private practice with Carr, Cox, Evans, and Riley until 1950. During the latter period, he also served as President of the Iowa State Bar Association from 1949 to 1950, and was active in the leadership of the American Bar Association. He was an active member of the Democratic Party.

Federal judicial service

Riley was nominated by President Harry S. Truman on November 29, 1950, to a seat on the United States District Court for the Southern District of Iowa vacated by Judge Carroll O. Switzer. He was confirmed by the United States Senate on December 14, 1950, and received his commission on December 27, 1950. His service terminated on December 29, 1956, due to his death.

References

Sources
 

1884 births
1956 deaths
People from Ainsworth, Iowa
Iowa State University alumni
Judges of the United States District Court for the Southern District of Iowa
United States district court judges appointed by Harry S. Truman
20th-century American judges